James Randolph may refer to:

Jimmy Randolph (born 1934), New York singer and performer
James Henry Randolph (1825–1900), US congressman from Tennessee
James F. Randolph, U.S. Representative from New Jersey
James Innes Randolph (1837–1887), Confederate army officer and poet